The Farmer's Wife is a 1941 British comedy drama film directed by Norman Lee and Leslie Arliss and starring Basil Sydney, Wilfrid Lawson and Nora Swinburne. It is based on the play The Farmer's Wife by Eden Phillpotts which had previously been adapted by Alfred Hitchcock for a 1928 film of the same name. It was produced by ABPC at Welwyn Studios, at a time when the company's main Elstree Studios had been requisitioned for wartime use.

Synopsis
Farmer Samuel Sweetland, a widower with two daughters, buys a large neighbouring farm that he has coveted all his life. Now convinced that he needs to remarry, he draws up a list of three possible candidates with the assistance of his housekeeper Araminta Grey. They are Louisa Windeatt, a wealthy and spirited fox-hunting widow; Thirza Tapper, a prim unmarried lady who owns a nearby cottage; and Mary Hearne, an attractive barmaid from London.

Meanwhile, Sweetland's daughters, the forceful, coquettish Petronell and the shyer Sibley, have their own romantic entanglements with the young men of the area. Petronell tips her hat at Richard Coaker, only to discover that he is in love with her younger sister, and she finds eventual comfort in the arms of another suitor, George. Sweetland's own courtships go badly as each of the women reject his offer of marriage. Dejected, it is only then that he realises it his faithful housekeeper Araminta whom he really loves.

Cast
 Basil Sydney as Samuel Sweetland
 Wilfrid Lawson as Churdles Ash
 Nora Swinburne as Araminta Grey
 Patricia Roc as Sibley
 Michael Wilding as Richard Coaker
 Bunty Payne as Petronell
 Enid Stamp-Taylor as Mary Hearne
 Betty Warren as Louisa Windeatt
 Viola Lyel as Thirza Tapper
 Edward Rigby as Tom Gurney
 Kenneth Griffith as George Smerdon
 A. Bromley Davenport as Henry Coaker
 Jimmy Godden as Sergeant
 Gilbert Gunn as Pianist
 James Harcourt as Valiant Dunnybrigg
 Mark Daly as P. C. Chave
 Davina Craig as Susie
 Hilda Bayley as Mrs. Rundle
 David Keir as Auctioneer
 Patrick Ludlow as Curate
 John Salew as Mr. Rundle
 Olga Slade as Minor role

References

Bibliography
 Strauss, Marc Raymond. Alfred Hitchcock's Silent Films. McFarland, 2015.

External links

1941 films
1941 drama films
1940s English-language films
Films directed by Norman Lee
Films directed by Leslie Arliss
British drama films
Films set in England
Films shot at Welwyn Studios
British films based on plays
Remakes of British films
British black-and-white films
1940s British films
Sound film remakes of silent films